The 1978 Appalachian State Mountaineers football team was an American football team that represented Appalachian State University as a member of the Southern Conference (SoCon) during the 1978 NCAA Division I-A football season. In their eighth year under head coach Jim Brakefield, the Mountaineers compiled an overall record of 7–4 with a mark of 4–2 in conference play, and finished third in the SoCon.

Schedule

References

Appalachian State
Appalachian State Mountaineers football seasons
Appalachian State Mountaineers football